Hashim Al-Mosawy is an Iraqi politician. He was the leader and Secretary-General of the Islamic Dawa Party - Iraq Organisation, the fifth-largest party within the ruling United Iraqi Alliance coalition.

He was born in Basra, Iraq in 1939, and died in Tehran, Iran on the 14 November 2016. He was the co-founder and re-founder of the Islamic Dawa Party - Iraq Organisation and he Played a huge part in helping out during the Resistance against Saddam Hussain who was the dictator/president of Iraq

References

Islamic Dawa Party – Iraq Organisation politicians
1939 births
2016 deaths